Ngangom Mohendra (9 April 1925 – 20 February 2000) was an Indian politician. He was a Member of Parliament, representing Inner Manipur in the Lok Sabha the lower house of India's Parliament.

Mohendra died in Nagamapal, Imphal on 20 February 2000, at the age of 74.

References

External links
 Official biographical sketch in Parliament of India website

1925 births
2000 deaths
Communist Party of India politicians from Manipur
India MPs 1991–1996
Lok Sabha members from Manipur